"Auf anderen Wegen" is a song by German recording artist Andreas Bourani. It was written by Bourani along with Julius Hartog for his second studio album Hey (2014), while production was helmed by Philipp Steinke.

Formats and track listings

Charts

Weekly charts

Year-end charts

References

2014 singles
Andreas Bourani songs
2014 songs
Universal Music Group singles
Songs written by Andreas Bourani